Star Trek Ship Construction Manual is a 1983 role-playing game supplement for Star Trek: The Role Playing Game published by FASA.

Contents
Star Trek Ship Construction Manual is a manual for use in designing ships of the various major starfaring races in the ST universe - the Federation, the Klingons, the Romulans, the Tholians, the Gorn, and the Orions.

Reception
William A. Barton reviewed Star Trek Ship Construction Manual in Space Gamer No. 70. Barton commented that "the ST Ship Construction Manual is quite well thought out, and more than adequate for building ships form the smallest scouts all the way up to the revamped Enterprise of The Wrath of Khan.  The clean simplicity of its design, emphasizing playability over needless complexity, could be used as a model by future designers of roleplaying starship manuals."

References

Role-playing game supplements introduced in 1983
Star Trek: The Role Playing Game supplements